The 65th World Science Fiction Convention (Worldcon), also known as Nippon 2007, was held on 30 August–3 September 2007 at the Pacifico Yokohama Convention Center and adjoining hotels in Yokohama, Japan.

The organising committee was chaired by Hiroaki Inoue.

This convention was also the 46th Annual Nihon SF Taikai.

This was the first Worldcon held in Asia.

Participants 

Attendance was 2,788, of whom 1,578 were from Japan.

Guests of Honor 

 Sakyo Komatsu (author)
 David Brin (author)
 Takumi Shibano (fan)
 Yoshitaka Amano (artist)
 Michael Whelan (artist)

Awards

2007 Hugo Awards 

The base of the 2007 Hugo Award included a silhouette of Mount Fuji as a backdrop and a statue of the Japanese superhero Ultraman standing just taller than the iconic Hugo Award rocket.

The Hugo Award nominations were announced on 28 March 2007. A correction was issued a few days later when award officials were notified that a computing error had resulted in the film Pan's Labyrinth being left off the nomination list for Best Dramatic Presentation, Long Form.

 Best Novel: "Rainbows End" by Vernor Vinge
 Best Novella: "A Billion Eves by Robert Reed
 Best Novelette: "The Djinn's Wife" by Ian McDonald
 Best Short Story: "Impossible Dreams" by Tim Pratt
 Best Related Book: James Tiptree Jr: The Double Life of Alice B. Sheldon by Julie Phillips
 Best Dramatic Presentation, Long Form: Pan's Labyrinth written and directed by Guillermo del Toro
 Best Dramatic Presentation, Short Form: Doctor Who: "The Girl in the Fireplace" written by Steven Moffat, directed by Euros Lyn
 Best Professional Editor, Long Form: Patrick Nielsen Hayden
 Best Professional Editor, Short Form: Gordon Van Gelder
 Best Professional Artist: Donato Giancola
 Best Semiprozine: Locus, edited by Charles N. Brown, Kirsten Gong-Wong & Liza Groen Trombi
 Best Fanzine: Science-Fiction Five-Yearly edited by Lee Hoffman, Geri Sullivan and Randy Byers
 Best Fan Writer: Dave Langford
 Best Fan Artist: Frank Wu

Other awards 

 John W. Campbell Award for Best New Writer: Naomi Novik

Future site selection 

The members of Nippon 2007 selected Montréal, Québec as the hosting city for the 67th World Science Fiction Convention, to be held in 2009.

See also 

 Hugo Award
 Science fiction
 Speculative fiction
 World Science Fiction Society
 Worldcon

References

External links 

 Nippon 2007 English-language homepage
 2007 Hugo Nomination Press Release

2007 conferences
2007 in Japan
Science fiction conventions in Asia
Worldcon